The University of Information Science and Technology "St. Paul The Apostle" (abbr. UIST) is a public university in North Macedonia. As of 2018–19 school year, a total of 375 students are enrolled at the university.

UIST was founded by the Parliament of the Republic of Macedonia by the Act on Establishment of the University for Information Technology in 2008. In 2010, the students of UIST made the first supercomputer (cluster computer) in Republic of North Macedonia.

The international outreach of the university results in UIST having a multinational student population from more than 40 countries worldwide, along with local students. UIST has accreditations for 15 Undergraduate and Master programs in English as the medium of instruction.
According to the Academic Ranking of World Universities for 2015–2016, UIST was ranked among the top 3 university in North Macedonia out of 19 other universities.

Organization
UIST has five faculties:
 Faculty of Communication Networks and Security (CNS)
 Faculty of Computer Science and Engineering (CSE)
 Faculty of Information Systems, Visualization, Multimedia and Animation (ISVMA)
 Faculty of Applied Information Technology, Machine Intelligence and Robotics (AITMR)
 Faculty of Information and Communication Science (ICS)

UIST has international collaboration and bilateral Memorandum of cooperation with several Universities worldwide:
 Oakland University, Rochester, Michigan, USA 
 Istanbul Universitsi, Istanbul, Turkey,
 Cumhuriyet Universiti, Sivas, Turkey
 Kütahya Dumlupınar University, Kütahya, Turkey.
 Technical University of Cluj-Napoca, Cluj-Napoca, Romania
 Universitatea de Vest din Timişoara, Timişoara, Romania, 
 Elizade University, Ondo, Nigeria
 University of Padova, Padova, Italy
 Nara Institute of Science and Technology, Nara, Japan
 Oakland University, Michigan, USA

References

External links
 

University of Information Science and Technology "St. Paul The Apostle"
Educational institutions established in 2009
2009 establishments in the Republic of Macedonia
Ohrid